Pedro Henriquez d'Azevedo y Alvarez de Toledo, Count of Fuentes de Valdepero  (1525 in Zamora, Spain – 22 July 1610 in Milan, Italy) was a Spanish general and statesman.

Biography
Born at Zamora, he was a page at the court of Philip II of Spain, training in Naples in 1557, aged 32 with Fernando Alvarez de Toledo, 3rd Duke of Alba, (1507–1582), Governor of the Duchy of Milan, 1555–1556, Viceroy of Naples, 1556–1557, Governor of the Habsburg Netherlands, Viceroy of Portugal, 1582–1584,

He took part in the 1580 campaign in Portugal under the Duke of Alba and in 1582 was given supreme command over the Spanish troops. In 1589, as Captain General of Portugal, he successfully defended Lisbon against the attack by the English Armada, led by John Norreys and Francis Drake.

Sent in 1591 by the king to the Netherlands, he assisted after the death of Alexander Farnese, Duke of Parma, his successor Peter Ernst von Mansfeld and later Ernst of Austria, after whose death he became intermittent stateholder of the Netherlands. He conquered Doullens and Cambrai during the Franco-Spanish War (1595–1598). His excessive severity persuaded Philip II to exchange him for Albert of Austria.

He was then made governor and Captain General of Milan, 1600–1610, dying in office aged 85, where he spread fear among the Italian nobility, especially the Venetians through his policies and use of the army. In 1599, he entered into a treaty with the Count of Savoy and assisted in the conspiracy of Biron. Under his rule a famous fortress, the Forte di Fuentes, where the river Adda meets Lake Como, still named after him and now ruined,  was built to guard the border against the Grisons near Colico, LC.

He died in office at Milan. He was married, 1585, aged 60, to Juana de Acevedo y Fonseca, who had been awarded the title by king Philip II of Spain in 1572, being thus suo jure 1st Countess of Fuentes de Valdepero, and during that marriage, he was therefore jure uxoris 1st Count of Fuentes. As he and his wife died childless, the title passed to one of her relatives, Manuel de Acevedo y Zúñiga,  6th Count of Monterrey, Ourense, Spain, Grandee of Spain by king Philip IV of Spain on 11 July 1628, Viceroy of Naples, 1631–1637.

References

Sources
 
Gran Enciclopedia de España, 1992, 22 vols, 11,052 pages, vol 8, page 3,574.

1525 births
1610 deaths
People from Zamora, Spain
16th-century Spanish nobility
17th-century Spanish nobility
Spanish generals
Pedro Henriquez d'Azevedo y Toledo
Spanish politicians
Spanish people of the Eighty Years' War